The 2004–05 San Jose Sharks season was the Sharks 14th season in the National Hockey League. Its games were cancelled due to the 2004–05 NHL lockout.

Schedule
The Sharks regular season schedule was announced on July 14, 2004. Their preseason schedule was released on August 12, 2004.

|-
| 1 || September 25 || Phoenix Coyotes
|-
| 2 || September 29 || @ Anaheim Mighty Ducks
|-
| 3 || September 30 || Vancouver Canucks
|-
| 4 || October 2 || Anaheim Mighty Ducks
|-
| 5 || October 6 || Los Angeles Kings
|-
| 6 || October 7 || @ Vancouver Canucks
|-
| 7 || October 9 || @ Phoenix Coyotes
|-

|-
| 1 || October 13 || Vancouver Canucks
|-
| 2 || October 15 || @ Anaheim Mighty Ducks
|-
| 3 || October 16 || Colorado Avalanche
|-
| 4 || October 19 || @ Columbus Blue Jackets
|-
| 5 || October 21 || @ Nashville Predators
|-
| 6 || October 23 || @ Boston Bruins
|-
| 7 || October 25 || @ New York Rangers
|-
| 8 || October 26 || @ Pittsburgh Penguins
|-
| 9 || October 28 || @ Buffalo Sabres
|-
| 10 || October 30 || @ St. Louis Blues
|-
| 11 || November 3 || Phoenix Coyotes
|-
| 12 || November 6 || Atlanta Thrashers
|-
| 13 || November 11 || Minnesota Wild
|-
| 14 || November 13 || Vancouver Canucks
|-
| 15 || November 17 || Detroit Red Wings
|-
| 16 || November 20 || Florida Panthers
|-
| 17 || November 22 || @ Phoenix Coyotes
|-
| 18 || November 24 || Chicago Blackhawks
|-
| 19 || November 26 || @ Dallas Stars
|-
| 20 || November 27 || @ Nashville Predators
|-
| 21 || November 29 || @ Detroit Red Wings
|-
| 22 || December 2 || Dallas Stars
|-
| 23 || December 4 || Washington Capitals
|-
| 24 || December 7 || Phoenix Coyotes
|-
| 25 || December 9 || Edmonton Oilers
|-
| 26 || December 11 || Carolina Hurricanes
|-
| 27 || December 13 || @ Dallas Stars
|-
| 28 || December 15 || @ Chicago Blackhawks
|-
| 29 || December 16 || @ Minnesota Wild
|-
| 30 || December 18 || Nashville Predators
|-
| 31 || December 22 || Phoenix Coyotes
|-
| 32 || December 26 || Los Angeles Kings
|-
| 33 || December 27 || @ Los Angeles Kings
|-
| 34 || December 30 || Minnesota Wild
|-
| 35 || December 31 || @ Phoenix Coyotes
|-
| 36 || January 2 || @ Edmonton Oilers
|-
| 37 || January 3 || @ Calgary Flames
|-
| 38 || January 6 || Dallas Stars
|-
| 39 || January 8 || Tampa Bay Lightning
|-
| 40 || January 10 || @ Vancouver Canucks
|-
| 41 || January 11 || @ Edmonton Oilers
|-
| 42 || January 13 || Los Angeles Kings
|-
| 43 || January 15 || St. Louis Blues
|-
| 44 || January 17 || Edmonton Oilers
|-
| 45 || January 19 || @ Anaheim Mighty Ducks
|-
| 46 || January 20 || Columbus Blue Jackets
|-
| 47 || January 22 || @ Colorado Avalanche
|-
| 48 || January 25 || @ Minnesota Wild
|-
| 49 || January 27 || @ Los Angeles Kings
|-
| 50 || January 28 || Dallas Stars
|-
| 51 || January 30 || Nashville Predators
|-
| 52 || February 1 || @ Calgary Flames
|-
| 53 || February 3 || @ Montreal Canadiens
|-
| 54 || February 5 || @ Ottawa Senators
|-
| 55 || February 7 || @ Toronto Maple Leafs
|-
| 56 || February 8 || @ Columbus Blue Jackets
|-
| 57 || February 10 || @ Philadelphia Flyers
|-
| 58 || February 15 || @ Vancouver Canucks
|-
| 59 || February 17 || Calgary Flames
|-
| 60 || February 19 || Boston Bruins
|-
| 61 || February 21 || @ St. Louis Blues
|-
| 62 || February 24 || @ New York Islanders
|-
| 63 || February 26 || @ Detroit Red Wings
|-
| 64 || February 27 || @ Chicago Blackhawks
|-
| 65 || March 1 || Anaheim Mighty Ducks
|-
| 66 || March 3 || Buffalo Sabres
|-
| 67 || March 6 || @ Colorado Avalanche
|-
| 68 || March 8 || @ Anaheim Mighty Ducks
|-
| 69 || March 10 || New Jersey Devils
|-
| 70 || March 12 || Chicago Blackhawks
|-
| 71 || March 13 || New York Rangers
|-
| 72 || March 17 || St. Louis Blues
|-
| 73 || March 19 || Detroit Red Wings
|-
| 74 || March 24 || Anaheim Mighty Ducks
|-
| 75 || March 26 || Columbus Blue Jackets
|-
| 76 || March 28 || Colorado Avalanche
|-
| 77 || March 30 || @ Los Angeles Kings
|-
| 78 || March 31 || Los Angeles Kings
|-
| 79 || April 2 || @ Phoenix Coyotes
|-
| 80 || April 4 || @ Dallas Stars
|-
| 81 || April 7 || Calgary Flames
|-
| 82 || April 9 || Anaheim Mighty Ducks
|-

Transactions
The Sharks were involved in the following transactions from June 8, 2004, the day after the deciding game of the 2004 Stanley Cup Finals, through February 16, 2005, the day the  season was officially cancelled.

Trades

Players acquired

Players lost

Signings

Draft picks
San Jose's picks at the 2004 NHL Entry Draft, which was held at the RBC Center in Raleigh, North Carolina on June 26–27, 2004.

Notes

References

San
San
San Jose Sharks seasons
San Jose Sharks
San Jose Sharks